is a passenger railway station in the town of Uchiko, Kita District, Ehime Prefecture, Japan. It is operated by JR Shikoku and has the station number "U11".

Lines
Although the station is officially on the Uchiko Line, JR Shikoku runs it operationally as part of Yosan Line and as such it only carries the "U" prefix common to other Yosan line stations. Only local trains stop at the station. Connections with other services are needed to travel further east of Matsuyama or further west of Iyo-Ōzu/Yawatahama on the line.

Layout
Ikazaki Station consists of a side platform serving a single track. There is no station building, only a shelter on the platform for waiting passengers. A short flight of steps leads to the platform from the access road. There is limited parking and a bike shed near the base of the steps. A siding branches off the track at the station.

History
On October 6, 1935, after the track had been re-gauged to 1,067 mm, the station became part of the Uchiko Line. The track at Ikazaki was re-aligned and the position of the station moved. The new station reopened on 3 March 1986. It was still designated as a station on the Uchiko Line but was now operated as part of the Yosan Line. With the privatization of JNR on 1 April 1987, control of the station passed to JR Shikoku.

Surrounding area
 Japan National Route 56

See also
 List of railway stations in Japan

References

External links
Station timetable

Railway stations in Ehime Prefecture
Stations of Shikoku Railway Company
Railway stations in Japan opened in 1920
Uchiko, Ehime